Marjorie Saunders (1916–1983) was a British film editor.

Selected filmography
 Brief Encounter (1945, associate editor)
 They Made Me a Fugitive (1947)
 The First Gentleman (1948)
 For Them That Trespass (1949)
 One Wild Oat (1951)
 Chelsea Story (1951)
 Come Back Peter (1952)
 Three Steps to the Gallows (1953)
 Double Exposure (1954)
 The Hornet's Nest (1955)
 The Narrowing Circle (1956)
 Behind the Headlines (1956)

References

External links
 

1916 births
1983 deaths
British film editors
British women film editors